Nasser bin Zayed Al Nahyan (died 2 June 2008) was an Emirati royal and a member of the Al Nahyan family. He was killed in a helicopter crash at age 41.

Early life
Sheikh Nasser was a son of Zayed bin Sultan Al Nahyan, the founding president of the United Arab Emirates. His mother was Sheikha Amna bint Salah Al Badi, who is from the Bedouin branch of the Dhawahir tribe. He had one full-brother, Sheikh Isa.

Career
Sheikh Nasser was a security officer, working in the royal bodyguard's office. He was also the chairman of the Abu Dhabi planning and economy department.

Personal life and death
Nasser bin Zayed's son, Ahmed bin Nasser, attended Abu Dhabi Police College from which he graduated in 2010. 

Sheikh Nasser died in a helicopter crash off the coast of Abu Dhabi on 2 June 2008. Funeral prayers for him and others killed in the accident were performed at the Sheikh Sultan bin Zayed Mosque in Al Bateen. He was buried at the burial ground in Al Bateen in Abu Dhabi on 3 June 2008.

Ancestry

References

2008 deaths
Children of presidents of the United Arab Emirates
Nasser
Victims of helicopter accidents or incidents
Year of birth missing
Sons of monarchs